The following outline is provided as an overview of and topical guide to Utah:

Utah – state in the Western United States. It became the 45th state admitted to the Union on January 4, 1896.  Utah is the 13th-largest, the 34th-most populous, and the 10th-least-densely populated of the 50 United States.  Approximately 80% of Utah's 2,817,222 people live along the Wasatch Front, centering on Salt Lake City, leaving vast expanses of the state nearly uninhabited and making the population the sixth most urbanized in the U.S. Utah is the most religiously homogeneous state in the Union. Approximately 63% of Utahns are reported to be members of the Church of Jesus Christ of Latter-day Saints or LDS (Mormons), which greatly influences Utah culture and daily life. The world headquarters of the Church of Jesus Christ of Latter-day Saints (LDS Church) is located in Utah's state capital.

General reference 

 Names
 Common name: Utah
 or 
 Official name: State of Utah
 Abbreviations and name codes
 Postal symbol:  UT
 ISO 3166-2 code:  US-UT
 Internet second-level domain:  .ut.us
 Nicknames
 Beehive State
 Mormon State
 Friendly State (in disuse) (formerly used on license plates)
 Greatest Snow on Earth (formerly used on all license plates; now an alternate slogan on license plates alongside the state's current tourism slogan, "Life Elevated")
 Adjectival: Utah
 Demonyms
 Utahn
 Utahan

Geography of Utah 

Geography of Utah
 Utah is: a U.S. state, a federal state of the United States of America
 Location
 Northern hemisphere
 Western hemisphere
 Americas
 North America
 Anglo America
 Northern America
 United States of America
 Contiguous United States
 Western United States
 Mountain West United States
 Southwestern United States
 Population of Utah: 2,763,885  (2010 U.S. Census)
 Area of Utah:
 Atlas of Utah

Places in Utah 

 Historic places in Utah
 Abandoned communities in Utah
 Ghost towns in Utah
 National Historic Landmarks in Utah
 National Register of Historic Places listings in Utah
 Bridges on the National Register of Historic Places in Utah
 National Natural Landmarks in Utah
 National parks in Utah
 State parks in Utah

Environment of Utah 

 Climate of Utah
 Superfund sites in Utah
 Wildlife of Utah
 Fauna of Utah
 Birds of Utah

Natural geographic features of Utah 
 Mountain ranges of Utah
 Plateaus of Utah
 Rivers of Utah
 Valleys of Utah

Regions of Utah 

 Northern Utah
 Southern Utah

Administrative divisions of Utah 

 The 29 counties of the state of Utah
 Municipalities in Utah
 Cities in Utah
 State capital of Utah: Salt Lake City
 Largest city of Utah: Salt Lake City
 City nicknames in Utah

Demography of Utah 

Demographics of Utah

Government and politics of Utah 

Politics of Utah
 Form of government: U.S. state government
 United States congressional delegations from Utah
 Utah State Capitol
 Elections in Utah
 Political party strength in Utah
 Utah Transfer of Public Lands Act, passed 2012, becomes effective 31 December 2014

Branches of the government of Utah 

Government of Utah

Executive branch of the government of Utah 
 Governor of Utah
 Lieutenant Governor of Utah
 State departments
 Utah Department of Transportation

Legislative branch of the government of Utah 

 Utah State Legislature (bicameral)
 Upper house: Utah Senate
 Lower house: Utah House of Representatives

Judicial branch of the government of Utah 

Courts of Utah
 Supreme Court of Utah

Law and order in Utah 

Law of Utah
 Cannabis in Utah
 Capital punishment  in Utah
 Individuals executed in Utah
 Constitution of Utah
 Crime in Utah
 Gun laws in Utah
 Law enforcement in Utah
 Law enforcement agencies in Utah
 Same-sex marriage in Utah

Military in Utah 

 Utah Air National Guard
 Utah Army National Guard

History of Utah 

History of Utah

History of Utah, by period 

Indigenous peoples
Domínguez–Escalante expedition, 1776
Adams–Onís Treaty of 1819
Mexican War of Independence, September 16, 1810 – August 24, 1821
Treaty of Córdoba, August 24, 1821
Mexican–American War, April 25, 1846 – February 2, 1848
Treaty of Guadalupe Hidalgo, February 2, 1848
Mormon settlement, 1847–1861
Mormon Trail, 1847–1869
Mormon handcart pioneers, 1856–1860
Unorganized territory of the United States, 1848–1850
State of Deseret (extralegal), 1849–1850
Territory of Utah, 1850–1896
Compromise of 1850
Walker War, 1853–1854
Tintic War, 1856
Mountain Meadows Massacre, 1857
Jefferson Territory (extralegal), 1859–1861
Pony Express, 1860–1861
American Civil War, April 12, 1861 – May 13, 1865
Utah in the American Civil War
First Transcontinental Telegraph completed 1861
Morrisite War, 1862
Black Hawk War, 1865–1872
History of women's suffrage in Utah
First transcontinental railroad completed on May 10, 1869
Powell Geographic Expedition of 1869
State of Utah becomes 45th State admitted to the United States of America on January 4, 1896
Zion National Park established on November 19, 1919
Utah National Park established on June 7, 1924
Utah National Park renamed Bryce Canyon National Park on February 25, 1928
Canyonlands National Park established on September 12, 1964
Arches National Park established on November 12, 1971
Capitol Reef National Park established on December 18, 1971
XIX Olympic Winter Games, 2002

Culture of Utah 

Culture of Utah
 Museums in Utah
 Religion in Utah
 The Church of Jesus Christ of Latter-day Saints in Utah
 Episcopal Diocese of Utah
 Scouting in Utah
 State symbols of Utah
 Flag of the State of Utah 
 Great Seal of the State of Utah

The arts in Utah 
 Music of Utah

Sports in Utah 

Sports in Utah
 Professional sports teams in Utah

Economy and infrastructure of Utah 
Economy of Utah
 Communications in Utah
 Newspapers in Utah
 Radio stations in Utah
 Television stations in Utah
 Energy in Utah
 List of power stations in Utah
 Solar power in Utah
 Uranium mining in Utah
 Wind power in Utah
 Health care in Utah
 Hospitals in Utah
 Transportation in Utah
 Airports in Utah
 Roads in Utah
 State highways in Utah

Education in Utah 

Education in Utah
 Schools in Utah
 School districts in Utah
 High schools in Utah
 Colleges and universities in Utah
 Utah System of Higher Education

See also

Topic overview:
Utah

Index of Utah-related articles

References

External links 

Utah
Utah
 1